KHBT (97.7 FM) is an American commercial radio station that serves the Humboldt, Iowa, area. The station broadcasts an Adult Contemporary format. KHBT is licensed to Open Roads Media, L.L.C., of Humboldt, Iowa.

The transmitter and broadcast tower are located in northeast Humboldt along Iowa Highway 3 near Montana Avenue.

KHBT is a FOX News, Iowa State University sports, and NASCAR affiliate. KHBT broadcasts Humboldt High School Wildcat sports, four daily newscasts Monday through Friday, Free Ride Friday, and is host of The Sam T. Blues Revue, the successor of Elwood's BluesMobile, which aired its final episode in 2017. The Blues Revue airs Wednesday afternoons at 8 PM CT. In 2020, KHBT recognized 50 years of broadcasting.

References

External links

HBT
Humboldt, Iowa
1970 establishments in Iowa